Kozub is a surname. Notable people with this surname include:

 Ernst Kozub (1924–1971), German opera singer
 Gennadiy Kozub (born 1969), Ukrainian art collector
 Łukasz Kozub (born 1997), Polish volleyball player
 Nik Kozub, Canadian musician
 Wojciech Kozub (born 1976), Polish biathlete

See also
 

Polish-language surnames
Ukrainian-language surnames